Miss World 1999, the 49th edition of the Miss World pageant, was held on 4 December 1999 at the Olympia Hall in London, United Kingdom. The pageant was hosted by Ulrika Jonsson and model Melanie Sykes. The 1999 pageant attracted 94 delegates from all over the world. The 1999 pageant also marked the first time that Scotland and Wales fielded their respective delegates. At the end of the event, 20-year-old Miss India Yukta Mookhey went on to win the Miss World 1999 crown. The preliminary swimsuit competition was held in Malta. She was crowned by her predecessor Linor Abargil of Israel. Protesters gathered outside the event, decrying it as a "sexist cattle market".

Results

Placements

Continental Queens of Beauty

Contestants

  – Shari Afua Smith
  – Lorena Silva
  – Verónica Denise Barrionuevo
  – Cindy Vanessa Cam Tin Martinus
  – Nalishebo Gaskell
  – Sandra Kolbl
  – Mary Watkins
  – Tania Rahman Tonni
  – Brigitta Callens
  – Ana Raquel Rivera Zambrana
  – Samra Begović
  – Alimah Isaacs
  – Paula de Souza Carvalho
  – Violeta Zdravkova
  – Mireille Eid
  – Mona Lisa Tatum
  – Lissette Sierra Ocayo
  – Mónica Elizabeth Escolar Danko
  – Fiorella Martínez
  – Ivana Petković
  – Sofia Georgiou
  – Helena Houdová
  – Luz Cecilia García Guzmán
  – Sofía Morán Trueba
  – Karin Laasmäe
  – Maria Laamanen
  – Sandra Bretones
  – Susan Hoecke
  – Mariam Sugru Bugri
  – Abigail Garcia
  – Evangelia Vatidou
  – Ana Beatriz González Scheel
  – Indra Changa
  – Ilona Marilyn van Veldhuisen
  – Irma Waleska Quijada Henríquez
  – Marsha Yuan Hu-Ma
  – Erika Dankai
  – Katrín Baldursdóttir
  – Yukta Mookhey
  – Emir-Maria Holohan Doyle
  – Jenny Chervoney
  – Gloria Nicoletti
  – Desiree Depass
  – Aya Mitsubori
  – Assel Issabayeva
  – Esther Muthoni Muthee
  – Han Na-na
  – Evija Ručevska
  – Norma Elias Naoum
  – Sebah Esther Tubman
  – Renata Mackevičiūtė
  – Tantely Naina Ramonjy
  – Jaclyn Lee Tze Wey
  – Catharine Attard
  – Danette Velasco Bataller
  – Shweta Singh
  – Coralie Ann Warburton
  – Augustine Iruviere
  – Annette Haukaas
  – Jessenia Casanova Reyes
  – Mariela Candia Ramos
  – Wendy Monteverde
  – Lalaine Bognot Edson
  – Marta Kwiecień
  – Joana Ines Texeira
  – Arlene Torres
  – Nicoleta Luciu
  – Elena Efimova
  – Stephanie Norrie
  – Anne-Mary Jorre
  – Audrey Quek Ai Woon
  – Andrea Verešová
  – Neda Gačnik
  – Sonia Raciti
  – Lorena Bernal Pascual
  – Dilumini de Alwis Jayasinghe
  – Ifelola Badejo
  – Colleen Tullonen
  – Jenny Louise Torsvik
  – Anita Buri
  – Manoa Froge
  – Hoyce Anderson Temu
  – Kamala Kumpu Na Ayutthaya
  – Sacha Anton
  – Ayşe Hatun Önal
  – Olga Savinskaya
  – Nicola Willoughby
  – Natasha Allas
  – Katherine Gonzalves
  – Martina Thorogood Heemsen
  – Clare Marie Daniels
  – Lana Marić
  – Cynthia Chikwanda
  – Brita Maseluthini

Judges

 Eric Morley †
 Louis Grech
 Luciana Gimenez
 Linda Pétursdóttir – Miss World 1988 from Iceland
 Dean Cain 
 Eddie Irvine 
 Terry O'Neill †
 Lennox Lewis 
 Wilnelia Merced – Miss World 1975 from Puerto Rico

Notes

Debuts

Returns

Last competed in 1989:
 
Last competed in 1990:
 
Last competed in 1994:
 
 
Last competed in 1996:
 
 
 
Last competed in 1997:

Withdrawals
  - Miss Denmark 1999, Zahide Bayram did not participate due to undisclosed reasons.
  - Miss Mauritius 1999, Micaella L'Hortalle did not participate due to lack of sponsorship.
  - Miss Namibia 1999, Vaanda Katjiuongua did not participate due to lack of sponsorship.
  - Miss Northern Ireland 1999, Zöe Salmon withdrew at the last minute because the organizers couldn't apply for UK separate entry on time due to the Northern Ireland peace process.

Replacements
  – Alisa Sisic - She was dethroned of her Miss Bosnia & Herzegovina 1999 crown due to her nude pictorials at Sarajevo Daily - Dnevni Avaz without her permission that made the organizers revoke her title.
  – Miriam Quiambao. Originally Miriam Quiambao was to represent Philippines in the Miss World 1999 pageant but was replaced by Lalaine Edson. Later, Miriam Quiambao who was Philippines representative to the Miss Universe 1999 finished as 1st runner-up.

Other notes
 This is the first time that the contestants were introduced in evening gowns.

References

External links
 Pageantopolis – Miss World 1999

Miss World
1999 in London
1999 beauty pageants
Beauty pageants in the United Kingdom
December 1999 events in the United Kingdom
Olympia London